Jack White (born 1975) is an American musician and singer-songwriter.

Jack White may also refer to:

Sports

Cricket
Jack White (Australian cricketer) (born 1999), Australian cricketer
Jack White (cricketer, born 1891) (1891–1961), English cricket captain
Jack White (cricketer, born 1893) (1893–1968), English cricketer
Jack White (cricketer, born 1992) (born 1992), English cricketer

Football
Jack White (footballer, born 1876) (1876–1933), Australian rules footballer for St Kilda
Jack White (footballer, born 1912) (1912–1982), Australian rules footballer for Hawthorn
Jack White (footballer, born 1879) (1879–?), English footballer
Jack White (footballer, born 1924) (1924–2011), English footballer

Other sports
Jack White (basketball) (born 1997), Australian basketball player
Jack White (golfer) (1873–1949), Scottish golfer
Jack White (infielder) (1905–1971), 1920s baseball infielder
Jack White (outfielder) (1878–1963), 1900s baseball outfielder
Jack White (racing driver) (1920–1988), American stock car racing driver

Other
Jack White (film producer) (1897–1984), film producer at Columbia Pictures (a.k.a. Preston Black)
Jack White (music producer) (born 1940), German producer of disco music
Jack White (politician), Canadian labour activist
Jack White (priest), Anglican archdeacon in India
Jack White (reporter) (1942–2005), American investigative reporter
Jack White (sculptor) (born 1940), American sculptor, painter and photographer
Jack White (trade unionist) (1879–1946), Irish activist and co-founder of the Irish Citizen's Army
Jack White (VC) (1896–1949), UK soldier, recognized for bravery in First World War
Jack E. White (1921–1988), American physician and cancer surgeon
James T. Licavoli (1904-1985), also known as Jack White, American mobster

See also 
Jack Whyte (1940–2021), Scottish-Canadian novelist of historical fiction
John White (disambiguation)